Gerald Davis (born 1974) is an artist based in Los Angeles.

Davis was born in Pittsburgh.   His early autobiographical paintings and drawings are  rendered in oil paint and pencil, using muted, almost monochrome, colours,  dealing with sexuality, desire and his memories of childhood trauma.
Later imagery includes scenes from his personal history as well as an exploration of universal archetypes, in "eccentric renditions of classical subjects."
He received his BFA from the Pennsylvania State University in 1997 and his MFA from the School of the Art Institute of Chicago in 1999.

Collections

Davis' work is in international collections, including the Whitney Museum of American Art, New York; Hammer Museum, Los Angeles; Museum of Contemporary Art, San Diego, San Diego; and the Saatchi Gallery, London.

Selected exhibitions

2022
You Can Cut All the Flowers, But You Cannot Keep Spring From Coming, Lundgren Gallery, Mallorca Spain

2019

Ecstatic Figure, La Loma Projects, Los Angeles

Rorschach Paintings, Lundgren Gallery, Mallorca Spain

2017

Paintings, Lundgren Gallery, Mallorca Spain

2016

House with Buried Figure, LTD, Los Angeles

2012

Paintings and Drawings, Lundgren Gallery, Mallorca Spain

2010

Nothing Is Coming to Me, Salon 94, New York

The Worry Vase, Parker Jones Gallery, Los Angeles

2009

The Damned, Salon 94, New York

2008

Unreal, Saatchi Gallery, London

2007

Der Wichser, Black Dragon Society, Los Angeles

At Home, curated by Mario Testino, Yvon Lambert Gallery, New York

2006

LAXed: Paintings From The Other Side, Peres Projects, Berlin, Germany

1986, Salon 94 and John Connelly Presents, New York

USA Today, Saatchi Gallery, London

From L.A., Baronian Francey, Brussels, Belgium

2005

Drawings, Tall Wall Space, The University of La Verne, California

Paintings and Drawings, Black Dragon Society, Los Angeles

2003

Gerald Davis: Drawings and Paintings, Black Dragon Society, Los Angeles, CA

2002

My Problem, Counterpoint Gallery, Los Angeles

2001

Drawing Invitational, Optimistic Gallery, Chicago

References

External links
Further information and images from John Connelly Presents
Images, texts and biography from the 
Gerald Davis on ArtNet.com
Further images from Black Dragon Society

20th-century American painters
American male painters
21st-century American painters
21st-century American male artists
1974 births
Living people
20th-century American male artists